Hyperosmia is an increased olfactory acuity (heightened sense of smell), usually caused by a lower threshold for odor.  This perceptual disorder arises when there is an abnormally increased signal at any point between the olfactory receptors and the olfactory cortex. The causes of hyperosmia may be genetic, hormonal, environmental or the result of benzodiazepine withdrawal syndrome.

Causes

Genetics
A study by Menashe et al. has found that individuals with a single nucleotide polymorphism variant in the OR11H7P pseudogene have a lower receptor activation threshold for isovaleric acid. These individuals are hyperosmic for this single odorant.

Another study by Keller et al. has found that people with the intact human odorant receptor OR7D4 are more sensitive to androstenone and androstadienone and thus find them unpleasant (individuals with the semi-functional OR7D4 have two non-synonymous single nucleotide polymorphisms in the OR7D4 pseudogene, resulting in two amino acid substitutions).  There has not yet been extensive research into the genetic background of those with general hyperosmia, rather than for just a single odorant.

Environmental
There has not been extensive research into environmental causes of hyperosmia, but there are some theories of some possible causes.

In a study by Atianjoh et al., it has been found that amphetamines decrease levels of dopamine in the olfactory bulbs of rodents. On this basis, it has been hypothesized that amphetamine use may cause hyperosmia in rodents and humans, but further research is still needed. Anecdotal support for the belief that amphetamines may cause hyperosmia comes from Oliver Sacks's account of a patient (who he later revealed to be himself) with a heightened sense of smell after taking amphetamines.

It has been observed that the inhalation of hydrocarbons can cause hyperosmia, most likely due to the destruction of dopaminergic neurons in the olfactory bulb.

Methotrexate, administered in the treatment of psoriasis, has been known to cause hyperosmia, and may be more likely to do so in patients with a history of migraines. However, this is only an observation and not part of a study; therefore, it is yet to be verified.

Treatment
Normal olfactory acuity will usually return over time if the cause is environmental, even if it is untreated.  The hyperosmic person may need to be removed from strong odorants for a period of time if the sensation becomes unbearable. Before they had been discontinued due to undesirable side effects, butyrophenones or thioridazine hydrochloride, both of which are dopamine antagonists, have been used to treat hyperosmia.

See also
Phantosmia
Hyposmia
Multiple chemical sensitivity, a condition that some believe is caused by a very acute sense of smell
Olfaction
Oliver Sacks
Benzodiazepine withdrawal syndrome
Parosmia

References

External links 

Olfaction